The Birches is a historic house on Foster Lane in Belgrade Lakes, Maine.  Built in 1916 to a design by John Calvin Stevens and John Howard Stevens, it is the best-preserved surviving structure related to The Belgrade Hotel, a large summer resort hotel which burned down in 1955.  It was listed on the National Register of Historic Places in 1996.

Description and history
It is a rectangular -story wood-frame structure, with a gabled roof and shingled exterior. Its main facade faces northwest, with an enclosed single-story hip-roofed porch extending across its width. The southwest roof face is adorned with an eyebrow dormer, and a fieldstone chimney rises through the northeast roof face. The interior has a large two-story living room, finished entirely in original varnished tongue-and-groove woodwork. A balcony runs around all four sides, with a stair rising along the wall dividing the room from bedrooms and bathrooms.

The house was built in 1916, as a satellite cottage to The Belgrade Hotel, built in 1899 and twice enlarged, all to designs by the noted Portland architect John Calvin Stevens.  The cottage is one of four built, and was probably designed by Stevens in conjunction with his son, John Howard Stevens.  The hotel burned down in 1955, and this cottage is the best-preserved of the three that survive.  It was sold as a separate property after the fire, and was used as a summer cottage until 1994, when it was weatherized for year-round occupancy.

See also
National Register of Historic Places listings in Kennebec County, Maine

References

Houses on the National Register of Historic Places in Maine
Houses completed in 1916
Houses in Kennebec County, Maine
National Register of Historic Places in Kennebec County, Maine